István Gáli (Gaáli) (5 July 1943 – 20 February 2020) was a welterweight boxer from Hungary who won a bronze medal at the 1967 European Championships. Next year he competed at the 1968 Olympics, but was eliminated in the third bout.

References
 István Gáli. sports-reference.com

1943 births
2020 deaths
Welterweight boxers
Olympic boxers of Hungary
Boxers at the 1968 Summer Olympics
Hungarian male boxers
Sportspeople from Borsod-Abaúj-Zemplén County
20th-century Hungarian people